Jay Walter Hilgenberg (born March 21, 1959) is an American former professional football player who was a center in the NFL. He played for the Chicago Bears, Cleveland Browns and the New Orleans Saints from 1981 to 1993.

He is the son of All-American University of Iowa center Jerry Hilgenberg and nephew of Minnesota Vikings linebacker Wally Hilgenberg. His brother Joel Hilgenberg played center for the New Orleans Saints, and the brothers were teammates in 1993 for the Saints.

Football career
Hilgenberg attended the University of Iowa in the late 1970s. He started in the NFL's Pro Bowl seven times.  He was a member of the winning team in Super Bowl XX as a member of the 1985 Chicago Bears as well as their Division Champion teams from 1984–88 and 1990.

He has been a nominee for induction into the Pro Football Hall of Fame. Hilgenberg is currently a game analyst for WBBM-AM Radio in Chicago and the Bears Radio Network.

References

1959 births
Living people
American football centers
Iowa Hawkeyes football players
Chicago Bears players
Cleveland Browns players
New Orleans Saints players
National Conference Pro Bowl players
Iowa City High School alumni